The   was held on 3 February 1980 in Keihin Film Theatre, Tsurumi, Kanagawa, Japan.

Awards
 Best Film: Taiyō o Nusunda Otoko
 Best New Actor: Yuji Honma – Jūkyūsai no Chizu
 Best Actor: Ken Ogata – Vengeance Is Mine
 Best Actress: Yūki Mizuhara – Angel Guts: Red Classroom
 Best New Actress: Miyuki Matsuda – Kindaichi Kosuke no Bōken
 Best Supporting Actor: Keizō Kanie – Angel Guts: Red Classroom, Jukyusai no chizu
 Best Supporting Actress: Ako – Akai kami no onna, Nureta shumatsu
 Best Director:
Kazuhiko Hasegawa – Taiyō o Nusunda Otoko
Chūsei Sone – Angel Guts: Red Classroom
 Best New Director: Mitsuo Yanagimachi – Jūkyūsai no Chizu
 Best Screenplay: Masaru Baba – Vengeance Is Mine
 Best Cinematography: Seizō Sengen – Yomigaeru kinrō, Hakuchū no Shikaku
 Special Prize:
Junko Miyashita (Career)
Shin'ya Yamamoto (director?) (Career)

Best 10
 Taiyō o Nusunda Otoko
 Woman with Red Hair
 Angel Guts: Red Classroom
 Motto Shinayaka ni Motto Shitataka ni
 Vengeance Is Mine
 Sonogo no Jingi Naki Tatakai
 Jūkyūsai no Chizu
 Tenshi no Yokubō
 Wet Weekend
 Keiko

References

Yokohama Film Festival
Yokohama Film Festival
Yokohama Film Festival
Yokohama Film Festival